The following low-power television stations broadcast on digital or analog channel 21 in the United States:

The following low-power stations, which are no longer licensed, formerly broadcast on analog or digital channel 21:
 K21AF in Wrangell, Alaska
 K21AO in Bethel, Alaska
 K21AX in Farmington, New Mexico
 K21CD-D in Ukiah, California
 K21CK in Petersburg, Alaska
 K21DF in Stillwater, Oklahoma
 K21EA-D in Lake Havasu City, Arizona
 K21GC in Safford, Arizona
 K21GR in Joshua Tree, etc., California
 K21KD-D in Wyola, Montana
 K21KX-D in Hermiston, Washington
 K21LV-D in Perryton, Texas
 K21MC-D in Hobbs, New Mexico
 K21NJ-D in Three Forks, Montana
 K21NL-D in Howard, Montana
 K21PC-D in Geronimo, Oklahoma
 KDUG-LD in Hemet, California
 KGRY-LD in Gila River Indian Community, Arizona
 KJWY-LP in Salem, Oregon
 KMIK-LD in Cedar Falls, Iowa
 KTOV-LP in Corpus Christi, Texas
 KXTM-LP in San Antonio, Texas
 W21DA-D in Dublin, Georgia
 W21DD-D in Naguabo, Puerto Rico
 WDLP-CD in Pompano Beach, Florida
 WGBI-LP in Farmington, Maine

References

21 low-power